Eryn Allen Kane is an American rhythm and blues musician from Detroit, Michigan who has become a frequent collaborator in the Chicago Music scene. Kane released her first EP, Aviary: Act 1, in 2015. In 2016, Kane released her second EP titled Aviary: Act II. Kane was also featured on Chance the Rapper's mixtape Coloring Book as well as Spike Lee's film Chi-Raq. Kane released her third EP in 2019 titled a tree planted by water.

Discography

 Aviary: Act 1 (2015)
 Aviary: Act II (2016)
 a tree planted by water (2019)

Guest appearances

References

Musicians from Chicago
Musicians from Detroit
21st-century American singers
American rhythm and blues singer-songwriters